SELEX Galileo (Saudi Arabia) is a subsidiary of defence electronics company Selex ES. It was launched by the predecessor of Selex ES, SELEX Galileo, on March 15, 2010.

See also
 Selex ES

References

External links
 Official website

Defence companies of Saudi Arabia
Science and technology in Saudi Arabia
Military equipment of Saudi Arabia
Selex ES